Bajaj Hindusthan Sugar Limited (BHSL) is a sugar producer in India, Asia's Number 1 and World's Number 4 integrated sugar company, it has an aggregated sugarcane crushing capacity of 136,000 tonnes crushed per day (TCD), and alcohol distillation capacity of 800 kilo liters per day (KLD) across 14 locations in the north Indian State of Uttar Pradesh (UP). The company is a leader in the Asian and Indian sugar industry and is also one of the largest producer of green fuel ethanol in India. It is a member of Bajaj Group. The company is headquartered in Mumbai.

The site selected for the first plant was at Gola Gokarannath in district Lakhimpur Kheri in the Terai region of Uttar Pradesh (UP), an area rich in sugar cane. Another sugar plant with a cane crushing capacity of 1400 TCD was set up in 1972 at Palia Kalan, a large cane supplying centre about 70 kilometres from Gola Gokarannath.

Kushagra Bajaj is the Chairman of Bajaj Hindusthan Sugar Ltd.

History 
The company was founded as Hindusthan Sugar Mills Limited by Jamnalal Bajaj in 1931. In 1988, it was renamed Bajaj Hindusthan Sugar Limited.

References

External links
Official site

Sugar companies of India
Companies based in Mumbai
Bajaj Group
Food and drink companies established in 1931
Manufacturing plants in Uttar Pradesh
Indian companies established in 1931
Companies listed on the National Stock Exchange of India
Companies listed on the Bombay Stock Exchange